KFGX may refer to:

 KFGX-LD, a low-power television station (channel 35) licensed to serve Fargo, North Dakota, United States
 Fleming-Mason Airport (ICAO code KFGX)